Baron Auckland is a title in both the Peerage of Ireland and the Peerage of Great Britain. The first creation came in 1789 when the prominent politician and financial expert William Eden was made Baron Auckland in the Peerage of Ireland. In 1793, he was created Baron Auckland, of West Auckland in the County of Durham, in the Peerage of Great Britain. Eden notably served as Chief Secretary for Ireland, Ambassador to Spain, and President of the Board of Trade. His second son, the second Baron, was also a politician and served as Governor-General of India. In 1839 he was created Baron Eden, of Norwood in the County of Surrey, and Earl of Auckland, in the Peerage of the United Kingdom. However, he never married, and the barony of Eden and the earldom became extinct on his death while he was succeeded in the baronies of Auckland by his younger brother, the third Baron. He was Bishop of both Sodor and Man and Bath and Wells. The titles descended from father to son until the death of the sixth Baron in 1941. He was succeeded by his cousin, the seventh Baron. He was the son of George Eden, third son of the fourth Baron. He was succeeded by his younger brother, the eighth Baron. , the titles are held by the latter's grandson, the tenth Baron, who succeeded his father in 1997.

The Barons Auckland are members of the prominent Eden family. The first Baron was the third son of Sir Robert Eden, 3rd Baronet, of West Auckland. His younger brother was Morton Eden, 1st Baron Henley, while his elder brother was Sir Robert Eden, 1st Baronet, of Maryland. The latter was the great-great-grandfather of Prime Minister Anthony Eden, 1st Earl of Avon, and the great-great-great-grandfather of John Eden, Baron Eden of Winton. The present Baron Auckland is also in remainder to the Eden Baronetcy of West Auckland, a title held by his kinsman the Lord Eden of Winton. William Eden, the eldest son of the first Baron, was Member of Parliament for Woodstock. Sir Ashley Eden, third son of the third Baron, was an official and diplomat in British India.

The city of Auckland in New Zealand was named after the first Earl of Auckland, the patron of  the city's founder, William Hobson. Several Auckland landmarks, including the hill and suburb Mount Eden and the sports ground Eden Park, are named directly or indirectly after the family.

Barons Auckland (1789; 1793)
William Eden, 1st Baron Auckland (1744–1814)
George Eden, 2nd Baron Auckland (1784–1849) (created Earl of Auckland in 1839)

Earls of Auckland (1839)
George Eden, 1st Earl of Auckland (1784–1849)

Barons Auckland (1789; 1793; reverted)
Robert John Eden, 3rd Baron Auckland (1799–1870)
William George Eden, 4th Baron Auckland (1829–1890)
William Morton Eden, 5th Baron Auckland (1859–1917)
Frederick Colvin George Eden, 6th Baron Auckland (1895–1941)
Geoffrey Morton Eden, 7th Baron Auckland (1891–1955)
Terence Eden, 8th Baron Auckland (1892–1957)
Ian George Eden, 9th Baron Auckland (1926–1997)
Robert Ian Burnard Eden, 10th Baron Auckland (born 1962)

The heir presumptive is the present holder's first cousin, Henry Vane Eden (born 1958).
The heir presumptive's heir apparent is his son, Oliver Eden (born 1990).

Male-line family tree

See also
Earl of Avon
Baron Henley
Eden baronets

References

Sources

Kidd, Charles, Williamson, David (editors). Debrett's Peerage and Baronetage (1990 edition). New York: St Martin's Press, 1990,

External links

Baronies in the Peerage of Ireland
Noble titles created in 1789
Baronies in the Peerage of Great Britain
Noble titles created in 1793
Eden family